Thomas E. Beer (born March 27, 1969) is a former National Football League (NFL) player.

Playing career
Beer played high school football at Elkton-Pigeon-Bay Port High School, a consolidated high school in the thumb area of Michigan.  He went on to play college football for Saginaw Valley State University before transferring to Wayne State University.

Beer was drafted in the 7th round of the 1994 NFL Draft by the Detroit Lions.  He played fullback in 1994, and linebacker in 1995 and 1996.  During his time with the Lions, Beers was among the team leaders in special teams tackles.  He started one game at strongside linebacker during the 1996 season.

Beer's career ended following the 1996 season.  Doctors had recommended retirement following a series of neurological testing.

Personal life
Beer is not related to the earlier NFL player named Tom Beer.

Beer has participated in Lions alumni and charity events since his retirement.

References

External links
 Tom E. Beer statistics at databasefootball.com
 Lions host former stars for alumni day festivities, www.DetroitLions.com

1969 births
Living people
Detroit Lions players
Wayne State Warriors football players
Saginaw Valley State Cardinals football players
People from Huron County, Michigan